Mạc (Hán tự: 莫) is a Vietnamese surname. The name is transliterated as Mo in Chinese and Mua in Hmong language. It is also of Gaelic origin, meaning son, used as a prefix in many Irish and Scottish surnames e.g. MacDonald, and MacGregor.

Mac is the anglicised variation of the surname Mạc.

Distribution
As a surname, Mac is the 409th most common surname, in Great Britain, with 23,149 bearers. It is most common in the City of Aberdeen, and Greater Manchester, where it is the 25th and 107th most common surname, in both counties having 3,268 bearers, respectively. Other concentrations include, the Western Isles, (13th,1,712), East Lothian, (63rd,1,698), the City of Glasgow, (90th,3,188), County Down, (147th,1,686), East Sussex, (247th,1,646), Belfast, (266th,1,682), Berkshire, (383rd,1,696), South Yorkshire, (466th,1,626), Merseyside, (490th,1,624), and Greater London, (1,189th,1,730).

Notable people with the surname Mạc
Mạc Đĩnh Chi
Mạc Cửu, a Chinese adventurer who played a role in relations between Cambodia and the Nguyen court
Mạc Đăng Doanh
Mạc Đăng Dung, a Vietnamese emperor and the founder of the Mạc dynasty
Mạc dynasty, ruled the northern provinces of Vietnam from 1527 until 1592
Mạc Mậu Hợp

Notable people with the surname Mac
 Alison Mac, British actress
 Bernie Mac, American comedian
 Annie Mac, Irish DJ and presenter

Vietnamese-language surnames

vi:Mạc (họ)